Jean-Leigh du Toit (born 18 January 2000) is a field hockey player from South Africa.

Personal life
Jean-Leigh du Toit  attended Hoërskool Dr EG Jansen,  studied at the University of Pretoria.

Career

Under–18
Du Toit made her debut for the South Africa U–18 in 2018 at the African Youth Games in Algiers.

Under–21
Du Toit made her debut for the South Africa U–21 in 2022 at the FIH Junior World Cup in Potchefstroom.

National team
Following her successful debut in the junior squad, Du Toit was named in the national team for the first time. In May 2022, she was named in the squad for the FIH World Cup in Terrassa and Amsterdam. Shortly after this announcement, she was also named in the squad for the Commonwealth Games in Birmingham.

References

External links

2000 births
Living people
South African female field hockey players
Female field hockey midfielders
Field hockey players at the 2018 African Youth Games
Field hockey players from Johannesburg
TuksHockey Club players
21st-century South African women
Field hockey players at the 2022 Commonwealth Games